Distant Vision is an ongoing experimental film project by Francis Ford Coppola. Different versions of this production have been broadcast to limited audiences from the stages of Oklahoma City Community College on June 5, 2015, and at UCLA School of Theater in July 2016.

Coppola led the project as a proof of concept piece for a richer, more in-depth future live broadcast that will recount the struggles and triumphs of three generations of an Italian-American family set against the birth and growth of the invention of television.

References

External links
 

2015 films
2010s Italian-language films
American avant-garde and experimental films
Films directed by Francis Ford Coppola
Films produced by Francis Ford Coppola
2010s American films